The 26th Golden Raspberry Awards, or Razzies, were held on March 4, 2006, at the Ivar Theatre in Hollywood, California to honor the worst films the film industry had to offer in 2005. The nominations for the Golden Raspberry Awards were announced on January 30, 2006. The most nominated film of the year was Son of the Mask with eight nominations, followed by The Dukes of Hazzard with seven, Dirty Love with six, Deuce Bigalow: European Gigolo and Bewitched with five. The only picture to take home multiple penalties was Dirty Love, with four. The official press release announcing the 2005 winners proclaimed Dirty Love "...a little stinker that no one but [Razzie voters] even seem to know existed."

Winners and nominees

Films with multiple nominations 
These films garnered multiple nominations:

Criticism 
The nomination for Tom Cruise well-received performance for Worst Actor in Steven Spielberg's War of the World was criticized for nominating the actor based on his multiple controversies throughout 2005 (what also reflected in the Most Tiresome Tabloid Targets category) instead of his actual role in the film.

See also

 2005 in film
 78th Academy Awards
 59th British Academy Film Awards
 63rd Golden Globe Awards
 12th Screen Actors Guild Awards

References

Golden Raspberry Awards
Golden Raspberry Awards ceremonies
2006 in American cinema
2006 in California
March 2006 events in the United States
Golden Raspberry